The 2014 season was the 133rd year in the history of Warwickshire County Cricket Club and their 120th as a first-class county. In 2014, Warwickshire competed in the first division of the County Championship, Group B of the Royal London One-Day Cup and the North Division of the NatWest t20 Blast. In the NatWest t20 Blast, the club competed under the name "Birmingham Bears" for the first time. Twenty years after completing a treble, Warwickshire won their first ever t20 title, beating Lancashire in the final on home soil. They also reached the final in the Royal London One-Day Cup, where they lost to Durham at Lord's. Warwickshire also finished second in the County Championship, behind Yorkshire.

Squad
The following players made at least one appearance for Warwickshire in the County Championship, Royal London One-Day Cup or NatWest t20 Blast during 2014. The age given is for the start of Warwickshire's first match of the season, on 13 April 2014.

Correct as of 29 August 2014

County Championship

Division One Table

Results

Royal London-One Day Cup

Group B Table

Fixtures

Knockout stage

Quarter-final

Semi-final

Final

NatWest t20 Blast

North Division Table

Results

Knockout stage

Quarter-final

Semi-final

Final

References

2014 in English cricket
2014